Sarab-e Ahmadvand (also Romanized as Sarāb-e Aḩmadvand; also known as Gachīneh, Gajīneh, and Machīneh) is a village in Nurabad Rural District, in the Central District of Delfan County, Lorestan Province, Iran. At the 2006 census, its population was 671, in 143 families.

References 

Towns and villages in Delfan County